Sharmila Rege (7 October 1964 – 13 July 2013) was an Indian sociologist, feminist scholar and author of Writing Caste, Writing Gender. She led the Krantijyoti Savitribai Phule Women's Studies Centre, (the department of Gender Studies) at University of Pune which position she occupied since 1991. She received the Malcolm Adiseshiah award for distinguished contribution to development studies from the Madras Institute of Development Studies (MIDS) in 2006.

Academic contribution 
Rege was one of the leading feminist scholars in India, whose work in developing a 'Dalit Standpoint Perspective' has been crucial in opening up feminist debates in India to questions of class, caste, religion and sexuality. Rege's work within the academia, to fight for the right of the Dalit student's rights, has been a testimony of her commitment to critical educational reform in India An obituary described her as a "Phule-Ambedkarite
Feminist Welder" who brought the "structural violence of caste and its linkages with sexuality and labour into the feminist discourse". Her concerns around the woman's question in India, contributed greatly to new and alternative methods of historiography, exposing the blind-spots of a Hindu Nation towards the Dalit voices and perspectives that have often been neglected in the political milieu of India's history. Her emphasis on relocating the central role of B. R. Ambedkar in the shaping of the modern nation state has ensured that the voice from the margins does not remain invisible opens up space for political contestation and dialogue in a public debate that is quickly being gentrified by the rhetoric of economic development and globalisation. In her last published work, Against the Madness of Manu, she sought to centralise Ambedkar's role in the women's movement by invoking his ideological fight against Brahminical patriarchy, and how the caste system engenders graded violence against women. Her particular focus on alternative history writing has given new life to the local and oral traditions of knowledge and cultural practice, by bringing them into public attention through translation projects that build archives of national memory.

In 2002, she established a day care centre for children in the women’s studies department.

Personal 
She died of colon cancer on 13 July 2013.

Bibliography
 Caste and gender: the violence against women in India, European University Institute, 1996
 Sociology of Gender: The Challenge of Feminist Sociological Thought, SAGE Publications India, 2003
 Writing Caste, Writing Gender, Zubaan, 2006.
 Savitribai Phule Second Memorial Lecture, NCERT, 2009
 Against the Madness of Manu, Navayana, 2013.

References

1964 births
2013 deaths
Indian sociologists
Deaths from colorectal cancer
Deaths from cancer in India
Indian women educational theorists
Writers from Pune
Scientists from Pune
Indian feminist writers
Indian women political writers
Indian political writers
20th-century Indian educational theorists
20th-century Indian women scientists
20th-century Indian social scientists
20th-century Indian women writers
20th-century Indian non-fiction writers
English-language writers from India
Women writers from Maharashtra
Women scientists from Maharashtra
Activists from Maharashtra
21st-century Indian women writers
21st-century Indian non-fiction writers
Academic staff of Savitribai Phule Pune University
Women educators from Maharashtra
Educators from Maharashtra
20th-century women educators